Walter DeLeon (May 3, 1884 – August 1, 1947) was an American screenwriter and playwright.

Biography 
Walter DeLeon was born on May 3, 1884 in Oakland, California. DeLeon made his playwright debut at Idora Park in Oakland. He wrote for 69 films that were released between 1921 and 1953, and acted in one film. He died on August 1, 1947 in Los Angeles, California.

Filmography
 Scared Stiff (1953)
 The Time of Their Lives (1946)
 Little Giant (1946)
 Birth of the Blues (1941)
 The Ghost Breakers (1940)
 Union Pacific (1939)
 The Big Broadcast of 1938 (1938)
 Ruggles of Red Gap (1935)
 Tillie and Gus (1933)
 The Phantom President (1932)
 Meet the Wife (1931)
 Won by a Neck (1930)
 Big Money (1930)
 The Sophomore (1929)
 The Little Giant (1926)
 The Ghost Breaker (1922)

References

External links

1884 births
1947 deaths
American male screenwriters
Writers from Oakland, California
Screenwriters from California
20th-century American male writers
20th-century American screenwriters